John Cobham (died 12 November 1399) was an English politician.

Life
Cobham was the son of John Cobham of Hever, Kent. His brother, Thomas Cobham, was also an MP for Kent. He married three times. Before 1363, he married Juliana, a widow from Sittingbourne, Kent. Around 1375, he married Joan d’Oyley from Staffordshire, also a widow. At some point before June 1398, he married a woman named Margaret.

Career
Cobham was Member of Parliament for Sussex 1378 and 1385, Surrey January 1380, April 1384, November 1384 and Kent January 1390, 1394
and September 1397. He was considered a loyal adherent to Richard II of England.

References

John
Year of birth missing
14th-century births
1399 deaths
14th-century English politicians
English MPs 1378
English MPs 1385
English MPs January 1380
English MPs April 1384
English MPs November 1384
English MPs January 1390
English MPs 1394
English MPs September 1397
People from Hever, Kent